Eugenio Félix Morel Bogado (born 2 February 1950) is a retired professional footballer.

He has been characterized as a very fast, talented left-footed player who scored many goals playing the left forward position.

Childhood and youth
Morel was seven years old when his family decided to go to Argentina in 1957.
With other hopes in the great Buenos Aires, he started to practice football which eventually will become his living for many years to come.

Career
Morel played his first games in Racing Club in Argentina in 1969, showing his quality in the tough Argentine football leagues. He had his debut in the first division league in 1970. Other teams he played for include Talleres de Remedios de Escalada (1972), Libertad of Paraguay (1974 to 1979), Argentinos Juniors (1980 to 1981), San Lorenzo de Almagro (1982), Cerro Porteño of Asunción (1983) and Oriente Petrolero of Bolivia (1984).
Later on he played for clubs of the countryside of Paraguay between 1986 and 1987 and also had brief stints at O'Higgins of Chile (1987); Tacuary (1989); Club 2 de Febrero and Club 3 de Mayo of Capiatá and Club 8 de Diciembre of Fernando de la Mora. He retired at the age of 46.

One of his most memorable goals happened at the 1979 Copa América, when he scored a bicycle kick goal against Brazil in the Estadio Defensores del Chaco in Asunción. The goal allowed Paraguay to advance to the finals and eventually win the Copa America tournament for the second time in history.

Personal life

His sons are Juan Eduardo, Claudio Marcelo, Emmanuel Andrés, Eugenio Ricardo, Pablo Sebastián and Félix Nicolás. Of all of them, Claudio is the only one that followed his steps by becoming a successful football player.

Honours

Player

Club 
Argentinos Juniors
Argentine Primera División Runners-up: 1980–81

International 
Paraguay
Copa América: 1979

References
 Viva Paraguay

1950 births
Living people
Paraguayan footballers
Paraguayan expatriate footballers
San Lorenzo de Almagro footballers
Argentinos Juniors footballers
Talleres de Remedios de Escalada footballers
Club Libertad footballers
Cerro Porteño players
O'Higgins F.C. footballers
Expatriate footballers in Chile
Expatriate footballers in Argentina
Copa América-winning players
1979 Copa América players
Paraguay international footballers
Association football forwards
Expatriate footballers in Bolivia
Racing Club de Avellaneda footballers
Oriente Petrolero players